Giant tortoises are any of various large land tortoises

Giant tortoise or giant tortoises may also refer to:

 Galápagos giant tortoise, Chelonoidis nigra are a complex of the largest living species of tortoise.

 Pinta giant tortoise or Pinta Island tortoise, Chelonoidis abingdonii, is a species of Galápagos tortoise native to Ecuador's Pinta Island that is most likely extinct since the death of Lonesome George
 Volcán Wolf giant tortoise, Chelonoidis becki, is a species of Galápagos tortoise native to the north side of Ecuador's Isabela Island
 Narborough Island giant tortoise or Fernandina Island tortoise Chelonoidis phantasticus, is a species of Galápagos tortoise that was last seen in 1906, until a single female individual was rediscovered living on Fernandina Island in February 2019.

 Aldabrachelys, a genus of giant tortoises of the Seychelles and Madagascan radiations
 †A. abrupta - Abrupt giant tortoise
 †A. grandidieri - Grandidier's giant tortoise
 Aldabra giant tortoise, A. gigantea with recognised subspecies:
A. g. arnoldi – Arnold's giant tortoise
†A. g. daudinii – Daudin's giant tortoise
A. g. gigantea – Aldabra giant tortoise
A. g. hololissa – Seychelles giant tortoise, the individual Jonathan being the oldest known living terrestrial animal in the world

 †Cylindraspis an extinct genus of tortoise with the following species:
 †C. indica, Réunion giant tortoise, from Réunion
 †C. inepta, Saddle-backed Mauritius giant tortoise, from Mauritius
 †C. peltastes, Domed Rodrigues giant tortoise, from Rodrigues
 †C. triserrata, Domed Mauritius giant tortoise, from Mauritius
 †C. vosmaeri, Saddle-backed Rodrigues giant tortoise, from Rodrigues

 †Tenerife giant tortoise, Centrochelys burchardi, a species of tortoise endemic to the island of Tenerife, in the Canary Islands
 †Gran Canaria giant tortoise, Centrochelys vulcanica, a species of tortoise endemic to the island of Gran Canaria, in the Canary Islands

 †Megalochelys atlas, an extinct species of giant tortoise, the largest known tortoise in the fossil record

 Yellow-footed tortoise (Chelonoidis denticulatus), also known as the Brazilian giant tortoise
 Bolson tortoise, (Gopherus flavomarginatus), also known as the Mexican giant tortoise

 Key: † indicates extinct.

See also 

 †Archelon, the largest turtle ever to have been documented
 Largest prehistoric animals - turtles and tortoises section
 Largest reptiles - turtle section
 Large tortoiseshell, a species of butterfly